USA-229, known before launch as NRO Launch 34 (NROL-34), is a pair of American signals intelligence satellites which were launched in 2011. They are operated by the United States National Reconnaissance Office.

Both satellites were deployed by a United Launch Alliance Atlas V 411 launch vehicle, which launched from SLC-3E at the Vandenberg Air Force Base. The launch occurred at 04:24 UTC on 15 April 2011. The rocket placed the satellites into a low Earth orbit. By 04:29 UTC, official updates on the status of the spacecraft had been discontinued.

Whilst details of the satellites and their missions are officially classified, amateur observers have identified that the Atlas V deployed two satellites, one of which has officially been catalogued as debris. The two spacecraft have been identified as being a pair of third or fourth generation Naval Ocean Surveillance System satellites. Current generation NOSS satellites are always launched and operated in pairs, and are used to locate and track ships and aircraft from the radio transmissions that they emit.

References 

Spacecraft launched in 2011
Spacecraft launched by Atlas rockets
USA satellites